Qurban Ali Khan is a Pakistani politician who had been a Member of the Provincial Assembly of Khyber Pakhtunkhwa, from May 2013 to May 2018. Previously he has been a member of the Provincial Assembly of the North-West Frontier Province from 2002 to 2007.

Political career
He was elected to the Provincial Assembly of the North-West Frontier Province as a candidate of Pakistan Peoples Party (PPP) from Constituency PF-16 (Nowshera-V) in 2002 Pakistani general election. He received 8,691 votes and defeated a candidate of Awami National Party (ANP).

He ran for the seat of the Provincial Assembly of the North-West Frontier Province as a candidate of PPP from Constituency PF-16 (Nowshera-V) in 2008 Pakistani general election but was unsuccessful. He received 7,753 votes and lost the seat to Pervaiz Ahmad Khan, a candidate of ANP.

He was re-elected to the Provincial Assembly of Khyber Pakhtunkhwa as a candidate of Pakistan Tehreek-e-Insaf from Constituency PK-16 (Nowshera-V) in 2013 Pakistani general election. He received 9,282 votes and defeated a candidate of Awami National Party.

References

Living people
Khyber Pakhtunkhwa MPAs 2013–2018
Pakistan Tehreek-e-Insaf politicians
North-West Frontier Province MPAs 2002–2007
Year of birth missing (living people)